The Sky Arrow is a tandem two-seat, high-wing pusher light aircraft that was manufactured by 3I (Iniziative Industriali Italiane). 

3I entered bankruptcy proceedings in 2008, and in 2012 the design was purchased by Magnaghi Aeronautica, of Naples, Italy.

Design and development
Magnaghi Aeronautica, the new owners of the design in 2012, announced that it will be upgraded with larger wing tanks, improved aerodynamics and stability, strengthened structural elements and a new avionics package. The Sky Arrow will be available as a completed certified aircraft for light sport  or as a kit. A four-seat version is planned. Magnaghi Aeronautica expects to market it for government utility roles, such as border patrol, pollution monitoring and aerial surveillance, with belly- and nose-mounted sensors.

The 3I Sky Arrow 600 Sport and the Magnaghi Aeronautica Sky Arrow LSA are both US Federal Aviation Administration approved special light-sport aircraft. The company completed FAR 23 type certification for the Sky Arrow TCNS.

Variants

Sky Arrow LSA
 Sky Arrow Sport
Meets ATSM requirements for the FAA Light-Sport category of aircraft.
 Sky Arrow 1450L (/)
kitplane version, meets FAA 51 percent builder rule.
Sky Arrow 650 TCN
Sky Arrow 650 TC
Sky Arrow 650 TCNS
Sky Arrow 650 TCS:
 (100 hp engine), VFR and Sky Arrow 650 TCNS for VFR Night - Maximum Takeoff Weight (MTOW) of 
Sky Arrow 710 RG:
 Sky Arrow 710 PLUS:
 Sky Arrow 650 ERA:
fitted with RAWAS instrumentation by the Atmospheric Turbulence Diffusion Division of the National Oceanic Atmospheric Administration and Iniziative Industriali Italiane, for use in territory control environmental monitoring and for scientific research purposes.

Specifications (650)

References

External links

Sky Arrow 650 ERA at the National Oceanic and Atmospheric Administration website.
 European Aviation Safety Agency Type Certificate Data Sheet

Homebuilt aircraft
1990s Italian sport aircraft
High-wing aircraft
T-tail aircraft
Aircraft first flown in 1992
Single-engined pusher aircraft